Princess Woronzoff (German: Die Fürstin Woronzoff) is a 1920 German silent adventure film directed by Adolf Gärtner and starring Ellen Richter, Hugo Flink and Rudolf Forster.

The film's sets were designed by the art director Hans Dreier.

Cast
 Ellen Richter
 Hugo Flink
 Rudolf Forster
 Artúr Somlay
 Emil Rameau
 Toni Tetzlaff
 Lotte Davis
 Alexander Ekert

References

Bibliography
 Bock, Hans-Michael & Bergfelder, Tim. The Concise CineGraph. Encyclopedia of German Cinema. Berghahn Books, 2009.

External links

1920 films
Films of the Weimar Republic
Films directed by Adolf Gärtner
German silent feature films
UFA GmbH films
1920 adventure films
German adventure films
German black-and-white films
Films set in Russia
Silent adventure films
1920s German films